This article is a list of statistics from the Ireland rugby union team's 33 international tours. The article also includes details of the Ireland Wolfhounds' and Developmental sides' three international tours.

Ireland Rugby Tours

Tour Statistics

Ireland A, Emerging Ireland & Development Rugby Tours

Tour Statistics

References